The Great Lakes Region is one of ten United States regions that currently sends teams to the Little League World Series, the largest youth baseball competition in the world. The region's participation in the LLWS dates back to 1957, when it was known as the Central Region. However, when the LLWS was expanded in 2001 from eight teams (four U.S. teams and four "International" teams from the rest of the world) to 16 teams (eight U.S. and eight International), the Central Region was split into the Great Lakes and Midwest Regions.

The Great Lakes Region has a unique definition that does not correspond with the normally understood definition of the "Great Lakes" area, even when the context is restricted to the U.S. Although eight U.S. states (and the Canadian province of Ontario) border on the Great Lakes, only four of them are in Little League's Great Lakes Region:

One state that does not border any of the Great Lakes, and in fact has no territory within the Great Lakes watershed, is included in this region:

Two states that border on the Great Lakes, New York and Pennsylvania are in other regions; Pennsylvania plays in the Mid-Atlantic region, while New York plays in the Metro region. The remaining U.S. state that borders on the Great Lakes, Minnesota,  is in the Midwest region. (The Canadian provinces that border the Great Lakes have their Little League champions participate in a nationwide tournament, with the winner representing Canada in the International bracket at the LLWS.)

Following the 2021 LLWS, Wisconsin has been moved to the Midwest Region. This move coincides with a planned expansion of the LLWS from 16 to 20 teams. This expansion was originally scheduled to occur for 2021, but was delayed to 2022 due to the COVID-19 pandemic.

Regional championship
The year's winner is indicated in green.

2001–2021

2022–present

LLWS results
As of the 2022 Little League World Series.

Results by state
As of the 2022 Little League World Series. Italics denote the state is no longer a member of the Great Lakes Region.

External links
Official site
Great Lakes Region Little League Tournament Historical Results

References

Great Lakes
Baseball competitions in the United States
Sports in the Midwestern United States
2001 establishments in the United States
Recurring sporting events established in 2001